Orthosiphon stamineus is a herb that is widely grown in tropical areas. It is also known as Orthosiphon aristatus. The  plant can be identified by its white or purple flowers bearing long, protruding stamens that resemble cats' whiskers. It is also commonly referred as "Misai Kucing" (Malaysian) or "Kumis Kucing"(Indonesian) which means cat whiskers. The herb is popularly known as Java tea and is used widely in the form of herbal tea in Asia. Java tea was possibly introduced to the West in the early 20th century.  The brewing of Java tea is similar to that for other teas. It is soaked in hot boiling water for about three minutes, and honey or milk is then added. It can be easily prepared as garden tea from the dried leaves. There are quite a number of commercial products derived from Orthosiphon stamineus. Cultivation areas and post-harvesting method can significantly affect the quality of the herb.

Phytochemicals isolated from the herb include terpenes, flavonoids, caffeic acid derivatives and essential oils. Sinensetin is a polyphenol found in O. stamineus.

Extensive pharmacological investigations on various aqueous and non-aqueous extractives of O. stamineus were carried out to characterize its therapeutic potentials and benefits. Such evidence-based studies revealed that O. stamineus possesses several activities, which are attributed to its phytochemical content. It was found that O. stamineus exhibits diuretic, hypouricemic, renal protective, antioxidant, anti-inflammatory, hepatoprotective, gastroprotective, anti-hypertensive, anti-diabetic, anti-hyperlipidemic, anti-microbial, and anorexic activities. It has been investigated in relation to osteoarthritis.

References

External links

 picture: Orthosiphon Stamineus (Misai Kucing)

stamineus
Flora of tropical Asia
Medicinal plants